Randy Travis William Dobnak (born January 17, 1995) is an American professional baseball pitcher in the Minnesota Twins organization.

Career
Dobnak attended South Park High School in South Park Township, Pennsylvania. Dobnak attended Alderson Broaddus University in Philippi, West Virginia, where he played college baseball in NCAA Division II for the Battlers.

Utica Unicorns
Dobnak went undrafted out of college in 2017 and played for the Utica Unicorns of the United Shore Professional Baseball League. Dobnak had previously caught the attention of Utica manager Jim Essian when Dobnak played with Essian's son as a freshman and sophomore at Alderson Broaddus. Dobnak recorded a 3–0 record and 2.31 ERA in 6 appearances with Utica.

Minnesota Twins
On August 1, 2017, Dobnak signed a minor league contract, receiving a signing bonus of $500, with the Minnesota Twins off the strength of YouTube videos of his outings - the Twins never scouted him in person. He played for the Elizabethton Twins and the Cedar Rapids Kernels in 2017, combining to go 2–0 with a 2.43 ERA in 33 innings.

In 2018, Dobnak returned to Cedar Rapids, going 10–5 with a 3.14 ERA in 129 innings.

In 2019, Dobnak began the season with the Class A-Advanced Fort Myers Miracle, then advanced to the Double-A Pensacola Blue Wahoos, and the Triple-A Rochester Red Wings. With those three teams in 2019, he compiled an overall 12–4 record with 2.07 ERA in 24 games (21 starts), while striking out 109 batters in 135 innings. On August 8, 2019, the Twins selected Dobnak's contract and promoted him to the major leagues. He made his debut on August 9, pitching four scoreless innings in relief. With the 2019 Twins, Dobnak was 2–1 with one save and a 1.59 ERA in nine appearances (five starts), while striking out 23 in  innings. He was included on the Twins' postseason roster, and started game 2 of the ALDS against the Yankees.

With the 2020 Minnesota Twins, Dobnak appeared in 10 games, compiling a 6–4 record with 4.05 ERA and 27 strikeouts in  innings pitched.

On March 28, 2021, Dobnak and the Twins agreed to a five-year, $9.25MM extension that included three club option years with escalators that can bring the total amount up to $29.75MM. On July 17, Dobnak was placed on the 60-day injured list with a finger strain. On September 1, Dobnak was activated off of the injured list. 

On March 21, 2022, Dobnak was placed on the 60-day injured list with discomfort in his right middle finger, the same finger in which he had suffered a strain in the year before. On September 14, 2022, the Twins placed Dobnak on outright waivers and he was sent to Triple-A.

Personal life
According to his LinkedIn profile, Dobnak has been driving for Uber and Lyft since October 2017 — and he's an excellent driver with a "4.99/5 Uber driver rating," his Twitter profile reads. "I have all five star [reviews] except for one," Dobnak told MLB.com in August 2019. "I have one four-star. I'm hoping it was a mistake. I don't remember doing anything bad."

Dobnak and Aerial Munson were married on September 28, 2019, in Maryland. When Twins fans began sharing the link to Dobnak and Munson's wedding registry online, the couple directed fans to instead donate to St. Jude Children's Research Hospital, raising over $4,000 for the hospital.

Dobnak grew up as a Pittsburgh Pirates fan, attending Opening Day annually and estimates having gone to over 150 games at PNC Park. He pitched at PNC Park for the first time on August 5, 2020, where he pitched 6 shutout innings and earned the victory in a 5-2 Twins win.

Dobnak is an lifelong fan and player of the fantasy massively multiplayer online role-playing game (MMORPG) RuneScape.

Legacy
Dobnak is regarded as one of the greatest players in USPBL history. Out of a total of 36 USPBL alumni who have signed with MLB organizations, Dobnak is the only player to have reached the major league level. Dobnak's signing by longtime Twins scout Billy Milos marked a shift in the way the organization approached scouting independent baseball league players. Milos never watched Dobnak pitch in person at the time of his signing, solely watching YouTube videos filmed by Dobnak's father.

References

External links

Alderson Broaddus Battlers bio

1995 births
Living people
Alderson Broaddus Battlers baseball players
Baseball players from Pennsylvania
Cedar Rapids Kernels players
Elizabethton Twins players
Fort Myers Miracle players
Lyft people
Major League Baseball pitchers
Minnesota Twins players
People from Allegheny County, Pennsylvania
Pensacola Blue Wahoos players
Rochester Red Wings players
Sportspeople from the Pittsburgh metropolitan area
Fort Myers Mighty Mussels players